Hector Vernon Ivan Seneviratne Corea (Sinhala: හෙක්ටර් වර්නන් අයිවන් සෙනෙවිරත්න කොරයා) was a priest of the Church of Ceylon.

Early life

Born in Chilaw, Ceylon, he was the son of James Alfred Ernest Corea and Letitia Grace Alice Seneviratne. His uncles were the freedom fighters Charles Edgar Corea and Victor Corea, who founded the Chilaw Association and the Ceylon National Congress. Ivan Corea was a direct descendant of King Dominicus Corea, also known as Edirille Rala. He was crowned King of Kotte and Sitawaka by Vimala Dharma Suriya, King of Kandy, in 1596. Mahatma Gandhi met Ivan Corea's father when he was hosted by the Corea Family in Chilaw, on his first and only visit to Ceylon in 1927. 

The young Corea was educated at Royal College Colombo. He joined the clergy of the Anglican Church of Ceylon in 1926, an early posting was at St. Phillip's Church in Kurana, Katunayake. Having spent several years in the priesthood, Corea was appointed Chaplain to the Bishop of Colombo. He was also made a Canon of the Cathedral Church of Christ in his sacerdotal silver jubilee. In the 1960s, Corea was appointed Rural Dean of Colombo, of the Church of Ceylon.

St. Luke's Church Borella

He was Vicar of St. Luke's Church Borella for over 25 years (1929–1954). Corea and his wife Ouida Corea played a key role in re-building St. Luke's Church in Borella. The edifice was designed by Corea, including the designs on each pillar, the octagonal tower of the sanctuary, the doors and windows, and all decorative motifs within the church. The foundation stone for the extension was laid on 17 October 1938 by the Commissary of the Bishop of Colombo, F. L. Beven.

The Easter Sunday Raid

St. Luke's Church was packed on Easter Sunday morning (5 April) 1942 when Admiral Chuichi Nagumo and the Japanese Imperial Navy attacked the city of Colombo, Ceylon, during World War II. Among the congregation attending the Easter Sunday service were British and Ceylonese military personnel. The zero fighters and bombers were led by Captain Mitsuo Fuchida, who also led the attack on Pearl Harbor.

The attack commenced around 7.30 a.m.; Corea was preaching at the time, when according to the parishioners of St. Luke's, the RAF Hawker Hurricanes swooped over the church to engage the Japanese Zero fighters in dogfights above the skies of Borella.

St. Paul's Church in Milagiriya

Following the death of his wife, Ouida, Corea left St. Luke's Church in 1954 and was appointed Vicar of St. Paul's Church in Milagiriya, one of the oldest churches in Ceylon. The church was first built by the Portuguese in the 15th Century as a Roman Catholic church. The British built a new church in 1848 and called it St. Paul's. He built the Lucien Jansz Memorial at St. Paul's Church Milagiriya as well as re-building St. Peter's Church in Pamankada.

Diocese of Colombo
The bishop of Colombo appointed a Historical Select Committee in 1941 to compile a history of the diocese, to celebrate the centennial of the foundation of the diocese. Corea was co-opted to the committee by the bishop and served as secretary. Corea is also mentioned in this historic church volume as "one of four men who not only distinguished themselves in Theology, but also had the privilege of assisting their teacher in later years as Lecturers in the Divinity  School. H.V.Ivan S.Corea has been honored by the bishop by being called to the office and dignity of an Examining Chaplain  to the Lord Bishop of Colombo." Corea also served on the Diocesan Council of the Centenary Year in 1945. He was a contributor to the Church Times newspaper in the United Kingdom.

Corea died in Madampe in 1968. Among those who paid their respects at his funeral in Maha Nuge Gardens, Colombo, were the governor-general of Ceylon William Gopallawa, the prime minister of Ceylon Dudley Senanayake and the finance minister  Junius Richard Jayewardene. The funeral service was led by Harold De Soyza, the first-ever Sri Lankan Anglican bishop of Colombo. The Ceylon Daily News of 1968 noted: "The Rt. Reverend Harold De Soysa, Bishop of Colombo paid tribute to the late Canon Corea referring to his ministry of loving service and made particular reference to his work on the history of the Diocese of Colombo." At the time of his death, Corea was editing a revised version of A History of the Church of Ceylon.

Piyaneni
Corea was immortalized in a song in the 1970s when the Sri Lankan singer Clarence Wijewardena composed 'Piyaneni' (Father) in memory of Corea. Piyaneni was sung by Wijewardena's music  partner Annesley Malewana and recorded at Auggie Ranaweera's studio in Bambalapitiya, in Colombo. Piyaneni went on to become a hit in South Asia.

Family
He was the father of Vernon Corea, a Sri Lankan broadcaster. His younger son was Ernest Corea, who was Sri Lanka's Ambassador to the United States, Cuba and Mexico.

References

External links
 Tribute Website to H. V. Ivan S. Corea of St. Luke's Church Borella 
 Information on Ivan Corea on Vernon Corea The Golden Voice of Radio Ceylon
 The Story of the Rodi
 St. Luke's Church Borella by Kumudu Amarasingham
 The Church of Ceylon (Anglican Communion)

1902 births
1968 deaths
Sri Lankan Anglicans
Sri Lankan Christian clergy
Sri Lankan Anglican priests
Anglican chaplains
Sri Lankan chaplains
Alumni of Royal College, Colombo
Sinhalese priests
Ivan